Neotamandua borealis is an extinct species of anteater. Fossils were found in the Honda Group at the Konzentrat-Lagerstätte of La Venta, Colombia.  It was suggested to be an ancestor of the giant anteater, and is also related to the tamanduas. The species was described by Hirschfeld in 1976.

Description 
Neotamandua borealis foraged on social insects such as ants and termites. It was both arboreal and terrestrial.

References 

Anteaters
Miocene xenarthrans
Miocene mammals of South America
Laventan
Neogene Colombia
Fossils of Colombia
Honda Group, Colombia
Fossil taxa described in 1976